Stijn Minne (born 29 June 1978) is a Belgian football defender who currently plays for RFC Wetteren. He spent 10 years playing for Zulte Waregem.

Honours
Zulte Waregem
Belgian Cup: 2005–06

References

External links
 
 

Living people
Belgian footballers
S.V. Zulte Waregem players
K.V.C. Westerlo players
Belgian Pro League players
Challenger Pro League players
1978 births
People from Jabbeke
Association football defenders
K.S.K. Voorwaarts Zwevezele players
Footballers from West Flanders